The CMC Cruiser is a standard 1/4-ton utility vehicle that has been in use since 1990, formerly made by Columbia Motors Corp. The vehicle was introduced in the Philippines in the mid-90s.

Origin
The CMC cruiser was developed in the Philippines and produced in unknown, but limited, numbers.

Description
The CMC cruiser is a Combat utility vehicle.  It can carry 3 to 5 persons.

Armament
The CMC Cruiser is mounted by an unknown type of machine gun. There are two guns - one at the front and one at the back.

References

Military vehicles of the Philippines
Military light utility vehicles